David Napier may refer to:
 David Napier (precision engineer) (1785–1873), Scottish engineer
 David Napier (marine engineer) (1790–1869), Scottish marine engineer
 David Napier (director), director of The War of Jenkins Ear